Walter Charles William Lumby (16 January 1915 – 2001) was an English professional footballer who played as a wing half.

References

1915 births
2001 deaths
People from the Borough of Swale
English footballers
Association football wing halves
Lloyds Paper Mills F.C. players
Murston Town F.C. players
Sittingbourne F.C. players
Grimsby Town F.C. players
Stockport County F.C. players
Lisburn Distillery F.C. players
Park United F.C. players
Weelsby Social F.C. players
English Football League players